Davenport House is an historic country house in the English village of Worfield, Shropshire. Located to the southwest of the village centre, it was built around 1727, and is now a Grade I listed building. Its grounds are listed at Grade II status.

The house was built by the architect Francis Smith of Warwick for Henry Davenport. It is in red brick with buff sandstone dressings on a stone plinth, with rusticated quoins, a modillion cornice, and a parapet with four urns.  The house consists of a main block with two storeys an attic and a basement, and nine bays on the front and five bays on the sides.  This is flanked by quadrant walls with rusticated pilasters leading to service pavilions with two storeys, five bays, and hipped slate roofs with cupolas.  In the centre is a porch with fluted Ionic columns, a cornice, and a balustraded parapet.  The windows are sashes with moulded architraves, those in the ground floor also with entablatures.

Restored in 2017, it is now used for events such as weddings, conferences and private parties.

See also
Listed buildings in Worfield

References

Works cited

External links
Davenport House – official website

18th-century establishments in England
Houses completed in the 18th century
Grade I listed buildings in Shropshire
Country houses in Shropshire
Georgian architecture in England